Liu Shuzhen  (died after 1381), was a ruler of the Chiefdom of Shuidong from 1381 to an unknown year.

References 

14th-century births
14th-century deaths
14th-century women rulers
14th-century Chinese people
Year of birth unknown
Year of death unknown